Cerdale is a genus of wormfishes native to the western Atlantic Ocean and the eastern Pacific Ocean.

Species
There are currently five recognized species in this genus:
 Cerdale fasciata C. E. Dawson, 1974
 Cerdale floridana Longley, 1934 (Pugjaw wormfish)
 Cerdale ionthas D. S. Jordan & C. H. Gilbert, 1882 (Spotted worm goby)
 Cerdale paludicola C. E. Dawson, 1974
 Cerdale prolata C. E. Dawson, 1974

References

Microdesmidae
Gobiidae
Marine fish genera
Taxa named by David Starr Jordan
Taxa named by Charles Henry Gilbert